Transafrik International Flight 662 (aka TKU662), was an L-100 cargo aircraft registered to Transafrik International of Uganda and leased to National Air Cargo "NAC" on a flight from Bagram Airfield, Afghanistan to Hamid Karzai International Airport in Kabul, Afghanistan. The aircraft impacted a mountain peak near the Kabul Airport causing the deaths of all eight crewmembers aboard.

Accident
After sunset, at about 7:20 p.m. local time, the aircraft departed Bagram Airfield (approximately 30 miles north of Kabul) for a short flight to Kabul, performing NATO supply freight flight MUA-662. TKU662, which was flying VFR, was asked by the Kabul Airport air traffic controller, Darrell Smith, to extend the outbound leg of flight in order to follow another flight inbound to the airport. The pilot, Captain Henry Bulos, complied with the request and subsequently impacted a mountain in the Pol-e Charkhi area on the outskirts of Kabul. The impact sight was approximately 11 kilometers northeast of Kabul Airport. At about 19:50 local time (15:20 GMT), the air traffic controller observed a fireball at approximately 1000 feet above the airport elevation. The impact occurred approximately 200 feet below a mountain peak.

Aircraft

Aftermath
On 2 October 2012, plaintiffs filed negligence complaints against Midwest ATC, NAC and Transafrik. The claims against NAC and Transafrik were dismissed. Midwest ATC (air traffic controller Darrell Smith's employer) claimed the pilot, Captain Bulos, was responsible for the crash since he was flying the L-100 under VFR flight rules and he was solely responsible for terrain avoidance. The United States Court of Appeals for the Second Circuit stated in their decision of 9 August 2021, "...we think that a reasonable jury could also find to the contrary that Smith should have foreseen that guiding the plane, at night, toward "jet black" terrain that he was unfamiliar with (and that lay outside Class D airspace) would result in danger to Flight 662."

References 

Aviation accidents and incidents
2012 in Afghanistan